The following is a list of events affecting Philippine television in 1981. Events listed include television show debuts, finales, cancellations, and channel launches, closures and rebrandings, as well as information about controversies and carriage disputes.

Events
 February 17–21: Highlights of pontifical visit of Pope John Paul II to the country are aired on national television stations with MBS and RPN airing these nationwide via satellite to promote satellite broadcasts.

Unknown
 Banahaw Broadcasting Corporation (BBC 2) rebranded as City 2 Television.

Premieres

Unknown
 The Other Side of Alma on MBS 4
 Miss Ellaneouson on MBS 4
 Rhythm of the City on MBS 4
 Gulong ng Buhay on RPN 9
 Tambakan Alley on RPN 9
 Helpline sa 9 on RPN 9
 Coney Reyes – Mumar on the Set on RPN 9
 Talambuhay on RPN 9
 Geym Na Geym on RPN 9
 Barkada Sa 9 on RPN 9
 Chat Silayan Drama Studio on GMA
 Real People on GMA
 Mga Balita sa Kilum-Kilum on GMA
 Isyu on RPN 9
 Fight Night on RPN 9

Finales
 November 28: PBA on MBS on MBS 4

Unknown
 Apat Na Sikat on IBC 13
 The Wild Wild West on IBC 13
 Ladies and Gentlemen... on BBC 2 (now City2)
 Coney Reyes-Mumar Drama Studio on GMA
 Sapak na Sapak Talaga! on GMA
 Prinsipe Abante on GMA
 Ms. Ellaneous on GMA
 TJ sa GMA on GMA
 Who Knows That? on GMA
 Eight Is Enough on GMA
 Gulong ng Palad on RPN 9

Births
 March 7 – Rica Peralejo, actress
 March 22 – Karylle, actress and host
 April 21 – Luis Manzano, actor and host
 May 12 – Dennis Trillo, actor
 June 20 – Maricar Reyes, actress and endorser
 July 20 – Biboy Ramirez
 July 3 – Empoy Marquez, actor
 August 5 – Tanya Garcia
 October 19 - Christian Bautista, singer and actor
 October 29 – Angelika Dela Cruz, singer and actress
 November 1 – Coco Martin, actor, producer, and endorser
 November 18 – Gian Magdangal, singer and actor

See also
1981 in television

References

 
Television in the Philippines by year
Philippine television-related lists